Healthcare in Wales is mainly provided by the Welsh public health service, NHS Wales. NHS Wales provides healthcare to all permanent residents that is free at the point of need and paid for from general taxation. Health is a matter that is devolved, and considerable differences are now developing between the public healthcare systems in the different countries of the United Kingdom, collectively the National Health Service (NHS). Though the public system dominates healthcare provision, private health care and a wide variety of alternative and complementary treatments are available for those willing to pay.

The largest hospital in the country is usually the University Hospital of Wales hospital, however the temporary Dragon's Heart Hospital set up in response to the COVID-19 pandemic in Wales was larger, and is the second largest hospital in the United Kingdom.

Unlike in England, NHS prescriptions are free to everyone registered with a GP in Wales.

Wales is the birthplace of the modern National Health Service, with the idea rolled out across the UK by the then-Health Minister Aneurin Bevan in 1948. Initially administered by the UK Government, since 1999 NHS Wales has been funded and managed by the Welsh Government.

NHS trusts and health boards

Before 2009, Wales was divided into 10 NHS trusts:
 Abertawe Bro Morgannwg University Health Board
 Cardiff and Vale University Health Board
 Cwm Taf NHS Trust
 Conwy & Denbighshire NHS Trust
 Gwent Healthcare NHS Trust
 Hywel Dda Local Health Board
 North East Wales NHS Trust
 North West Wales NHS Trust
 Powys Teaching Health Board
 Velindre University NHS Trust

Current healthboards 
Wales is now divided into 7 local health boards and 3 NHS trusts:
 Local Health Boards:
 Aneurin Bevan University Health Board
 Betsi Cadwaladr University Health Board
 Cardiff and Vale University Health Board
 Cwm Taf Morgannwg University Health Board
 Hywel Dda University Health Board
 Powys Teaching Health Board
 Swansea Bay University Health Board
 All-Wales NHS trusts:
 Welsh Ambulance Services NHS Trust
 Velindre University NHS Trust
 Public Health Wales

Welsh Ambulance Services NHS Trust manages all ambulance services in Wales from its base in Denbighshire.

Primary Care
Out-of-hours services in north and west Wales were reported to have reached ‘crisis point’ in April 2019. Services at Withybush General Hospital in Pembrokeshire and Prince Philip Hospital in Carmarthenshire had to close for the weekend of 30/31 March.   During 2018 there were at least 146 urgent care shifts in Wales which did not have a single GP on the out-of-hours service.

Pharmacies
There are plans to enhance the role of community pharmacists in Wales.  The plans commissioned by the Welsh government and drawn up by the Welsh Pharmaceutical Committee envisage pharmacy independent prescribers in every community pharmacy integrated with GP practices for access to patient records.  This will enable the common ailment service, which enables pharmacists to treat 26 common illnesses, such as dry eye, indigestion and cold sores, to be extended and the pharmacists will be able to refer patients for tests.  702 pharmacies in Wales provided a total 43,158 consultations common ailment service consultations in 2018/2019, more than double the number in the previous year.  In May 2019 97% of pharmacies in the country were offering the service.

A pilot ‘test and treat’ service for sore throat began in 70 community pharmacies in the Cwm Taf and Betsi Cadwaladr local health board areas in November 2018.  The pharmacists do a swab test to find out if the sore throat was caused by a viral or a bacterial infection.  Only 20% of cases required a prescription of antibiotics.

Community Services
In April 2019  Vaughan Gething announced an £11 million fund to transform health and social care services in North Wales. Mental health practitioners will work with ambulance crews and in police control rooms and crisis cafes, safe havens and strengthened home treatment services will be developed.  Early intervention services for children and old people will be strengthened.

Care and health statistics

Coronavirus outbreak

The Welsh healthcare system has been particularly impacted by the outbreak of Coronavirus in early 2020. This has been exacerbated by the fact the Welsh population is, according to Nuffield Trust research, on average "older, sicker and more deprived than the English population – so its NHS has to work harder".

The Welsh Government made specific changes to healthcare in Wales to deal with the outbreak, including cancelling elective operations, building the UK's second largest hospital at the Millennium Stadium in Cardiff, and approving the "COVID emergency ventilator", a device designed by a medical consultant based in Ammanford. Nonetheless, Wales in late March had the largest local outbreak in the UK, centred around the Aneurin Bevan Health Board in Newport which saw a higher number of cases per 1,000 people than any other city including London.

See also
 Healthcare in the United Kingdom
 List of hospitals in Wales
 Social care in Wales

References